Close Harmony is a 1981 American short documentary film directed by Nigel Noble. The film chronicles how a children's choir of 4th- and 5th-graders at the Brooklyn Friends School and elderly retirees at a Brooklyn Jewish seniors' center combine to give an annual joint concert.

Reception
Writing in The New York Times, John J. O'Connor called Close Harmony "the kind of production that whizzes by dazzlingly, leaving the audience drenched in smiles and tears and hoping for just a bit more".

Awards
Close Harmony won the Academy Award for Best Documentary (Short Subject) at the 54th Academy Awards. After airing on PBS, Close Harmony was nominated for a News & Documentary Emmy Awards for Outstanding Informational Cultural or Historical Programming at the 3rd News & Documentary Emmy Awards.

References

External links

1981 films
1981 short films
1981 independent films
1981 documentary films
American independent films
American short documentary films
Best Documentary Short Subject Academy Award winners
Films directed by Nigel Noble
Documentary films about old age
Documentary films about music and musicians
Documentary films about New York City
Films set in Brooklyn
Choirs
1980s short documentary films
1980s English-language films
1980s American films